St Helen's Division, Suffolk is an electoral division of Suffolk which returns one county councillor to Suffolk County Council. Part of the division is located in the South East Area of Ipswich and comprises part of Alexandra and Holywells wards of Ipswich Borough Council. It was created in 2004 following recommendations from the Boundary Committee for England that University Division be renamed St. Helen's Division.

Councillors
The following councillors were elected since 2005.

References

Electoral Divisions of Suffolk
South East Area, Ipswich